Dušan Uškovič (born 9 April 1985) is a Slovak footballer who plays as a striker who last played for FC Hradec Králové.

External links
FK Dukla Banská Bystrica profile 

1985 births
Living people
Slovak footballers
FC Baník Prievidza players
MŠK Rimavská Sobota players
FK Dukla Banská Bystrica players
MFK Zemplín Michalovce players
FC Hradec Králové players
Expatriate footballers in the Czech Republic
Association football forwards
Slovak Super Liga players
Sportspeople from Prešov